BCL-6 corepressor is a protein that in humans is encoded by the BCOR gene.

Function 
The protein encoded by this gene was identified as an interacting corepressor of BCL6, a POZ/zinc finger transcription repressor that is required for germinal center formation and may influence apoptosis. This protein selectively interacts with the POZ domain of BCL6, but not with eight other POZ proteins. Specific class I and II histone deacetylases (HDACs) have been shown to interact with this protein, which suggests a possible link between the two classes of HDACs. At least four alternatively spliced transcript variants, which encode different isoforms, have been reported for this gene.

Clinical significance 
Mutations in the BCOR gene cause a form of syndromic microphthalmia (small eye) called MCOPS2. This syndrome incorporates microphthalmia, congenital cataracts, cardiac defects, dental defects and skeletal anomalies. Mutations in this gene have also been found associated to acute myeloid leukemia.

Interactions 
BCOR has been shown to interact with MLLT3 and BCL6.

References

Further reading

External links 
 GeneReviews/NCBI/NIH/UW entry on Anophthalmia / Microphthalmia Overview
GeneReviews/NCBI/NIH/UW entry on Lenz Microphthalmia Syndrome